Banquereau or Banquereau Bank is an ocean bank in the North Atlantic Ocean southeast of Nova Scotia, Canada.

References

External links
 

Undersea banks of the Atlantic Ocean
Fishing communities in Canada